The third season of the television series Ally McBeal commenced airing in the United States on October 25, 1999, concluded on May 22, 2000, and consisted of 21 episodes. The entire season originally aired Mondays at 9pm, just like the seasons before.

A month before the premiere of the season, Fox began airing Ally, a half-hour show that consisted of re-edited scenes from the first two seasons and previously unseen footage, with the intention of making it a sitcom. 13 episodes of the show were shot, but only 10 were broadcast.

It was released on DVD as a six disc boxed set under the title of Ally McBeal: Season Three on October 7, 2002, just like the two seasons that aired before and in the U.S. on December 22, 2009.

The third season had an average rating of 12.3 million viewers in the United States and was ranked #39 on the complete ranking sheet of all the year's shows. This was the second highest rated season of Ally McBeal.

On the 52nd Primetime Emmy Awards, the show won an Emmy in the category of Outstanding Sound Mixing for a Comedy Series or a Special for the season premiere episode Car Wash. Kevin Fallon cited the sex scene from the episode Car Wash as one of "TV's 13 Dirtiest Sex Scenes" in a column for The Daily Beast.

Crew
The season was produced by 20th Century Fox Home Entertainment and David E. Kelley Productions. The executive producers were Bill D'Elia and the creator David E. Kelley, who also wrote all 23 episodes just like the two seasons before, with the exception of co-writing the episodes Out in the Cold and In Search of Pygmies with Josh Caplan, and co-writing the episode Turning Thirty with Jill Goldsmith. Jonathan Pontell and Alicia West served as the co-executive producers.

Cast
The third season had ten major roles receive star billing. Calista Flockhart as Ally McBeal, Greg Germann as Richard Fish, Peter MacNicol as John Cage, Jane Krakowski as Elaine Vassal, Lisa Nicole Carson as Renée Raddick, Gil Bellows as Billy Thomas, Courtney Thorne-Smith as Georgia Thomas, Vonda Shepard as herself, Portia de Rossi as Nelle Porter and Lucy Liu as Ling Woo all returned to the main cast.

The season featured the departure of two original cast members, Gil Bellows and Courtney Thorne-Smith. Bellows left to star on The Agency and Thorne Smith was cast on According to Jim. Bellows' character was killed off in the episode Boy Next Door. According to the actor himself, the character was originally intended to stay only for one season, but the popularity kept him for two more.

James LeGros made his debut as Mark Albert, a lawyer that replaced Billy at the firm. The character was recurring, and was upgraded to contract status as of season 4.

Various supporting characters from the previous seasons returned to reprise their recurring roles, including Dyan Cannon making her final appearances as Judge Jennifer "Whipper" Cone, Albert Hall as Judge Seymore Walsh, Jennifer Holliday as Lisa Knowles, Harrison Page as Reverend Mark Newman, Tracey Ullman as Dr. Tracy Clark, and Renée Elise Goldsberry, Vatrena King and Sy Smith as the backup singers for Vonda Shepard. Gina Philips had a recurring role as Billy's secretary Sandy Hingle.

This season also featured a variety of celebrities. Al Green, Gladys Knight, and Gloria Gaynor all appeared in the form of Ally's hallucinations, while Macy Gray and Randy Newman appeared as performers at the bar. Farrah Fawcett portrays Robin Jones, a newspaper editor accused of sexual harassment.  Loretta Devine appeared as a client who also sings during the course of one of Ally's hallucinations following Billy's death. And Tina Turner made an appearance.

Episodes

References

External links
 Ally McBeal Episode List at IMDb.com

1999 American television seasons
2000 American television seasons
Ally McBeal